Fung Nin Road, formerly Town Hall, is an at-grade MTR Light Rail stop located at the junction of Castle Peak Road and Fung Nin Road in Yuen Long District. It began service on 18 September 1988 and belongs to Zone 5. It serves Fung Nin Road and Yuen Long Plaza.

References

MTR Light Rail stops
Former Kowloon–Canton Railway stations
Yuen Long District
Railway stations in Hong Kong opened in 1988